MaliVai Washington was the defending champion, but lost in the final to Wayne Ferreira. The score was 3–6, 6–4, 6–3.

Seeds

Draw

Finals

Top half

Bottom half

References

External links
 Official results archive (ATP)
 Official results archive (ITF)

1995 ATP Tour
1995 Singles